The 1936 Utah gubernatorial election was held on November 3, 1936. Incumbent Democrat Henry H. Blood defeated Republican nominee Ray E. Dillman with 64.59% of the vote.

General election

Candidates
Henry H. Blood, Democratic
Ray E. Dillman, Republican

Results

References

1936
Utah